Filippo Spinelli (1566–1616) was a Roman Catholic cardinal.

Biography
On 6 May 1592, he was consecrated bishop by Alfonso Gesualdo di Conza, Cardinal-Bishop of Ostia e Velletri.

While bishop, he was the principal consecrator of Giuseppe Saluzzo, Bishop of Ruvo (1604); and Jan Andrzej Próchnicki, Bishop of Kamyanets-Podilskyi (1607).

References

1566 births
1616 deaths
17th-century Italian cardinals
Apostolic Nuncios to the Holy Roman Empire
Clergy from Naples